The following events occurred in April 1954:

April 1, 1954 (Thursday)
The U.S. Congress and President Dwight D. Eisenhower authorize the founding of the United States Air Force Academy in Colorado.
South Point School is founded in Kolkata, India. It would become the largest school in the world by 1988.
The new Cardiff Airport at Rhoose in South Wales opens to passenger transport after operations were transferred from RAF Pengam Moors.

April 2, 1954 (Friday)
Walt Disney signs a contract with ABC television for the Disneyland series, and plans are announced for the building of the Disneyland theme park (provisionally called "Disneylandia") in California, along with a prospectus for the company's potential investors.
Died: Hoyt Vandenberg, United States Air Force general (b. 1899)

April 3, 1954 (Saturday)
Petrov Affair: Diplomat Vladimir Petrov defects from the Soviet Union and asks for political asylum in Australia, beginning a major political incident.
A Douglas C-47A-80-DL Skytrain, operated by Devlet Hava Yolları, crashes 15 minutes after taking off from Adana Airport in Turkey, bound for Istanbul. All 25 people on board are killed.
On the River Thames in London, UK, the 100th annual Boat Race between the universities of Oxford and Cambridge is won by Oxford.

April 4, 1954 (Sunday)
Suffering from failing memory, legendary symphony conductor Arturo Toscanini is obliged to abandon plans for the German Requiem and introduce an alternative programme at his last concert.

April 5, 1954 (Monday)
Born: Christopher S. Nelson, actor

April 6, 1954 (Tuesday)
United States Senator Joseph McCarthy appears on See It Now to confront journalist Ed Murrow: he describes Murrow as "a symbol, a leader, and the cleverest of the jackal pack which is always found at the throat of anyone who dares to expose individual Communists and traitors".

April 7, 1954 (Wednesday)
US President Dwight D. Eisenhower gives his "domino theory" speech during a news conference.
Born: Jackie Chan, actor and film director, in Beijing, China

April 8, 1954 (Thursday)
Trans-Canada Air Lines Flight 9: a Royal Canadian Air Force Canadair Harvard and a Trans-Canada Airlines Canadair North Star collide over Moose Jaw, Saskatchewan, Canada. The total number of deaths is 37, including 36 people aboard the two aircraft and one person on the ground. 
South African Airways Flight 201: a de Havilland Comet 1, operated by South African Airways, disintegrates in mid-air as a result of fatigue failure while flying over the Mediterranean Sea from Rome to Cairo. All 14 passengers and seven crew are killed.
Died: Fritzi Scheff, 74, US actress and singer
Born: David Mccormick, Computer Science Teacher, Born in Singapore, Changi

April 9, 1954 (Friday)
First Indochina War: Joseph Laniel, Prime Minister of France, warns the People's Republic of China to stop sending aid to the Viet Minh revolutionaries.

April 10, 1954 (Saturday)
KRGV-TV began operation.
Born:
 Anne Lamott, American novelist and nonfiction writer; in San Francisco, California
 Peter MacNicol, American actor; in Dallas, Texas
 Juan Williams, Panamanian-born American journalist and political analyst; in Colón, Panama
Died: Auguste Lumière, 91, French film pioneer

April 11, 1954 (Sunday) 

Italian driver Piero Scotti wins the 1954 Coppa della Toscana sports car race in a Ferrari 375 MM.
In a general election in Belgium, the Christian Social Party wins 95 of the 212 seats in the Chamber of Representatives, and 49 of the 106 seats in the Senate. The government, led by Jean Van Houtte, loses its majority in parliament. The two other main parties, the Socialist and Liberal Party, subsequently form a rare "purple" government, with Achille Van Acker as Prime Minister.
Raymond Impanis wins the 52nd edition of the Paris–Roubaix cycling race.
The 1954 All-Ireland Senior Hurling Championship opens with the first round of the Leinster Senior Hurling Championship.
The 1954 New Orleans Women's Open golf tournament, part of the LPGA Tour, concludes. Marlene Bauer wins the tournament, with Betty Jameson coming in second.
April 11, 1954, is considered by search engine True Knowledge the least eventful day in the 20th century. No significant newsworthy events, births, or deaths are known to have happened on this day.
Born:
 Ian F. Akyildiz (born Ilhan Fuat Akyildiz), Turkish American midelectrical engineer; in Istanbul, Turkey
 Abdullah Atalar, Turkish scientist and academic
 Aleksandr Averin, Soviet Olympic cyclist; in Baku, Azerbaijan Soviet Socialist Republic, Soviet Union
 Benedykt Kocot, Polish Olympic cyclist; in Chrząstowice, Opole Voivodeship, Poland
 Francis Lickerish (born John Francis Lickerish), British composer, guitarist and lutenist; in Cambridge, England
 David Perrett, Scottish evolutionary psychologist
 Teo Peter, Romanian rock musician (Compact); in Cluj-Napoca, Romania (d. 2004, traffic collision)
 Ian Redmond, English field biologist and conservationist; in Malaysia
 Éric Renaut, French professional footballer; in Saint-Germain-en-Laye, France
 Willie Royster, American professional baseball catcher; in Clarksville, Virginia (d. 2015)
 Attila Sudár, Hungarian Olympic champion water polo player; in Budapest, Hungary
 Died: 
 Paul Specht, American dance bandleader (b. 1895)

April 12, 1954 (Monday)
Bill Haley and His Comets record the ground-breaking single "Rock Around the Clock" at the Pythian Temple studios in New York City.
Died:
Luis Cabrera Lobato, 77, Mexican lawyer, politician and writer
Prince Nikola of Yugoslavia, 25, killed in a road accident

April 13, 1954 (Tuesday)
While taking off from Xiengkhouang, Laos, a Lockheed C-60A-5-LO Lodestar operated by Société Indochinoise de Ravitaillement crashes, killing 16 of the 23 people on board.
 A Douglas C-47-DL Skytrain belonging to the Chilean Air Force, carrying a cargo of meat from Santiago to Los Cóndores Air Base, crashes near Batuco, killing all 14 people on board.
Died: Angus L. Macdonald, 63, Canadian politician, Premier of Nova Scotia (heart attack)

April 14, 1954 (Wednesday)
Aneurin Bevan resigns from the British Labour Party's Shadow Cabinet in protest over his party's failure to oppose the rearmament of West Germany.
Harold Connolly becomes interim Premier of Nova Scotia, Canada, after the sudden death of Angus L. Macdonald.

April 15, 1954 (Thursday)
While towing a barge from Skagway, Alaska, to Vancouver, British Columbia, Canada, the 541-ton Canadian tug Chelan sinks off the entrance to Sumner Strait west of Cape Decision in Southeast Alaska. All 14 people on the ship are lost.

April 16, 1954 (Friday)
US Vice President Richard Nixon tells the press that the United States may be "putting our own boys in Indochina regardless of Allied support".
Steam trains operate for the last time on the Clinchfield Railroad, between Kingsport and Erwin, Tennessee, United States.
Born: Ellen Barkin, US actress, in New York City

April 17, 1954 (Saturday)
Born: Roddy Piper, Canadian wrestler, in Saskatoon (d. 2015)
Died: Lucrețiu Pătrășcanu, 53, and Remus Koffler, 52, Romanian communist activists, executed after a show trial

April 18, 1954 (Sunday) 
A British minesweeper, operated by the Royal Naval Volunteer Reserve, catches fire and sinks in the English Channel off Ostend, Belgium. All 31 crew members are rescued by the Dutch steamship Phoenix and the French ship .

April 19, 1954 (Monday)
Two KGB couriers from the USSR arrive in Sydney Airport to escort Evdokia Petrova, a Soviet intelligence officer and the wife of Vladimir Petrov, who had recently defected to the Australian Security Intelligence Organisation, back to the USSR. The couriers are met by anti-Communist demonstrators, and the incident makes world headlines. The photograph of Petrova being manhandled by the two couriers becomes an iconic Australian image of the 1950s, and she is removed from the plane at Darwin.

April 20, 1954 (Tuesday)
A United States Air Force Kaiser-Frazier C-119F Flying Boxcar, after a flight from Williams Air Force Base in Mesa, Arizona, crashes into a fog-shrouded ridge on Mission Point while approaching Burbank Airport in California. All seven people on board are killed.
A new station is opened at Tacoma, Washington, United States, on the Chicago, Milwaukee, St. Paul and Pacific Railroad.
Died: Michael Manning, 25, Irish murderer, the last person to be executed in the Irish Republic

April 21, 1954 (Wednesday)
Died: Emil Leon Post, 57, Polish American mathematician and logician

April 22, 1954 (Thursday)
France's Foreign Minister Georges Bidault tells US Secretary of State John Foster Dulles that only U.S. air strikes can save Điện Biên Phủ; France drops its objections to a multinational effort. British PM Winston Churchill refuses to give any undertakings about United Kingdom military action in Indochina.
Army–McCarthy hearings: Senator Joseph McCarthy begins hearings investigating the United States Army for being "soft" on Communism. The hearings are broadcast live on US television.
The 1951 United Nations Convention Relating to the Status of Refugees comes into force, defining the status of refugees and setting out the basis for granting right of asylum.

April 23, 1954 (Friday)
An Aerolineas Argentinas Douglas C-47A-5-DK Skytrain, diverted to La Rioja, Argentina from El Plumerillo Airport in Mendoza because of severe turbulence in the Córdoba area, crashes in mountainous terrain near Sierra del Vilgo, killing all 25 people on board.
Born: Michael Moore, US documentary filmmaker, in Flint, Michigan

April 24, 1954 (Saturday)
Wolverhampton Wanderers football club wins the English Football League First Division title for the first time in its history.

April 25, 1954 (Sunday)
Bell Labs announces the invention of the first practical silicon solar cell. These cells have about 6% efficiency.

April 26, 1954 (Monday)
The 1954 Geneva Conference, an international conference on Korea and Indo-China, opens in Switzerland.
Akira Kurosawa's film, The Seven Samurai, is released in Japan.

April 27, 1954 (Tuesday)
Celtic F.C. defeat Aberdeen F.C. 2-1 in the final of the Scottish Cup football competition.
Born: Frank Bainimarama, prime minister of Fiji since 2007
Died: Antoni Bolesław Dobrowolski, 81, Polish scientist and explorer

April 28, 1954 (Wednesday)
U.S. Secretary of State John Foster Dulles accuses Communist China of sending combat troops to Indo-China to train Viet Minh guerrillas.
Died: Léon Jouhaux, 74, French labor leader and Nobel Peace Prize laureate

April 29, 1954 (Thursday)
Born: Jake Burton Carpenter, US co-inventor of the snowboard, in Manhattan, New York (died 2019); 
Jerry Seinfeld, US comedian and actor, in Brooklyn, New York
Died: Joe May, 73, Austrian-born film director and producer

April 30, 1954 (Friday)
Bengali leader A. K. Fazlul Huq begins a visit to Kolkata, against the wishes of Mohammad Ali Bogra, Prime Minister of Pakistan.
The last passenger services run on the Clinchfield Railroad between Elkhorn and Spartanburg, South Carolina, United States.
Born: Jane Campion, New Zealand screenwriter, producer, and director, in Wellington

References

1954
1954-04
1954-04